French Park is a  rural village community in the central east part of the Riverina.  It is situated by road, about 8 kilometres east of Milbrulong and 15 kilometres west of Tootool.

French Park Post Office opened on 16 August 1884 and closed in 1966.

French Park railway station

Notes and references

Towns in the Riverina
Towns in New South Wales